Ulnar collateral artery may refer to:

 Inferior ulnar collateral artery
 Superior ulnar collateral artery